Harry Owen was a professional rugby league footballer who played in the 1920s. He played at club level for Castleford (Heritage №).

References

External links
Search for "Owen" at rugbyleagueproject.org
Owen Memory Box Search at archive.castigersheritage.com

Castleford Tigers players
English rugby league players
Place of birth missing
Place of death missing
Year of birth missing
Year of death missing